The Insurance Corporation of British Columbia (ICBC) is a provincial Crown corporation in British Columbia providing insurance. ICBC was created in 1973 by the NDP government of Premier Dave Barrett.

By law, any vehicle registered and driven or parked on public streets in British Columbia must be covered by ICBC's basic insurance package, which can be purchased from independent brokers across the province.  This basic coverage, called "Autoplan," includes protection from third party legal liability, under-insured motorist protection, accident benefits, hit-and-run protection, and inverse liability.

History 
The original purpose of ICBC was to provide universal and affordable compulsory public auto insurance in British Columbia by operating on a non-profit basis. However, in March 2010, Christy Clark's BC Liberal government announced that it would require ICBC to pay the province dividends totaling some $778 million over three years, thus signaling the end of ICBC’s operation as a non-profit Crown corporation, and also making it the only for-profit public auto insurance provider in Canada. These dividends eventually totalled $1.2 billion. Since ICBC's creation, its responsibilities have expanded to include driver licensing, vehicle registration, and various road safety initiatives.

When ICBC was established, it initially held a monopoly on all automobile insurance in the province, but in 1977 its enabling legislation was amended to allow private insurers to compete with it in the market for optional (additional) insurance (including coverage such as extended liability, collision, and comprehensive plans). ICBC continues to both hold a monopoly on basic insurance and offer optional additional coverage.

Recent history 

On November 23, 2016, the provincial government announced that 'luxury' cars (those worth over $150,000) will no longer be insured by ICBC. In 2016, there were approximately 3000 cars in this class insured by ICBC; the government claimed that this change would save approximately $2.3 million per year. High-end car dealers have criticized this change, arguing that it would be better to adjust the rates that these car owners pay rather than ignore an entire segment of vehicles on the road. In 2017 ICBC introduced a modified version of this new system, whereby 'luxury' vehicles could still be insured but would face having to pay higher premiums. Under this new system, "Certain luxury vehicles that are considered to be high-value vehicles are charged higher Basic Autoplan insurance premiums, as of January 8, 2017". Vehicles that are classified as 'luxury' vehicles may also require an application to "obtain own damage coverage, which includes Collision, Comprehensive, and Specified Perils coverage.".

In 2019, ICBC overhauled its rate structure for liability insurance by shifting to a private-sector model where high-risk categories pay higher premiums. Attorney General David Eby has condemned the high rates, stressing the need for price reductions for young drivers, while acknowledging that rates are still subsidized.

In February 2020 the BC provincial government announced that they were switching ICBC from a "litigation based model" to a "no-fault" model. Under this new model "people involved in vehicle crashes can no longer sue  for damages except in cases involving court convictions for offences like negligence, street racing, impaired driving, or in cases of faulty manufacturing, botched repairs and the over-service of alcohol by a business". Instead of suing, people "will receive benefits, payments for medical treatment and compensation directly from ICBC, using amounts set by the province depending on the type of injury". This change is estimated to save ICBC "$2.9 billion in legal fees, pain and suffering and injury claims in 2022". Of the $2.9 billion, $1.2 billion will be "redirected into boosting treatment benefits and quickening response times for claims", and 1.7 billion will be used to implement the 20% rate cut. In January 2021 the BCUC approved a "a 15 per cent decrease to basic insurance rates", with ICBC stating that "With the introduction of ICBC's new Enhanced Care coverage in May 2021, drivers will save on average 20 per cent on their combined basic and optional vehicle insurance".

In February 2021 the BC government announced that BC drivers "will get a one-time cheque averaging $190" due to "An improved financial outlook at ICBC, partially the result of fewer crashes and accident claims during the pandemic". A second rebate was announced in July 2021, averaging $120 dollars per policy holder.

In March 2022 the BC government announced that ICBC "will provide a one-time relief rebate of $110 to customers to ease the financial burden of increased gas prices caused by the invasion of Ukraine by Russian forces." The government stated that the funds for the rebates would come from the "net income of $1.9 billion for the fiscal year ending March 31, 2022", with the remainder being "reinvested into ICBC’s capital reserves to ensure rates remain affordable for the long term."

Operations

Governance 
ICBC is governed by a board of directors appointed according to the provisions of the Insurance Corporation Act, ICBC's enabling statute. The board of directors, the CEO, and ICBC management govern ICBC in accordance with corporate governance best practices, and in accordance with the provisions of the enabling legislation, the Motor Vehicle Act, other legislation applicable to ICBC, and directives from the provincial Cabinet Committee. Proof of insurance is demonstrated, in part, by the application of a decal to the licence plate. As of May 1st 2022 decals are discontinued and will no longer be issued. This was done as part of the transition to online renewals.

Rates and finances 

Like other insurance companies, ICBC bases its premiums on a client's claims history, type of automobile, and geographic location.  The Corporation's discount plan (called "Roadstar" and "Roadstar Gold") rewards safe drivers with reduced premiums based on the number of years the driver has been free of successful claims against them.

Rates applicable to ICBC's basic automobile insurance coverage are subject to the review of, and are set by, the British Columbia Utilities Commission. In practice, however, the Cabinet of the provincial government controls ICBC’s rate setting through its power to set target financial outcomes (such as capital reserve ratios and profits), and through its ability to issue Special Directives to the BCUC.

Revenue collected by the Corporation goes mostly towards paying insurance benefits and operational costs. The remainder is devoted to fulfilling ICBC’s mandate to promote safe driving (the "RoadSense" campaign), as well as various other loss prevention strategies.

See also

Manitoba Public Insurance
Saskatchewan Government Insurance
Société de l'assurance automobile du Québec
AirCare (emissions program)

References

External links

The Insurance Corporation Act, the enabling legislation of ICBC 

Financial services companies established in 1973
Crown corporations of British Columbia
Motor vehicle registration agencies
Government-owned insurance companies of Canada
Financial services companies based in British Columbia